KDOM (1580 AM) is a radio station broadcasting a country music format. Licensed to Windom, Minnesota, United States. The station is currently owned by Steve and Laura White, through licensee Next Step Broadcasting, Inc.

1580 AM is a Canadian clear-channel frequency, on which CKDO is the dominant Class A station.

References

External links
KDOM Facebook

Radio stations in Minnesota
Country radio stations in the United States
Radio stations established in 1986
1986 establishments in Minnesota
Windom, Minnesota